"Kingdom of Rust" is the first single from Doves' fourth studio album of the same name. The single was released on 30 March 2009 via Heavenly Records. The 7" single features the exclusive track "Push Me On," which was produced by John Leckie, while the CD single features an edited remix of "Push Me On" by Playgroup. Three limited edition 12" singles featuring remixes by Prins Thomas, Playgroup, Still Going, and The Glimmers were released on 13 April 2009. "Kingdom of Rust" was played for the first time on Zane Lowe's BBC Radio 1 show on 2 February 2009. The single debuted on the UK Singles Chart at #28. The song also featured in the 2009 American horror/comedy film Zombieland, in the series 14 Bolivia Special and series 16 Middle East Special of Top Gear.

The music video for the song, directed by China Moo-Young and starring Neil Newbon, premiered on 11 February 2009. Stereogum posted a free MP3 download of Playgroup's Megamix of "Push Me On" (the full-length version) on 9 March 2009.

Track listings

Credits
 "Kingdom of Rust" produced by Doves and Dan Austin; mixed by Michael H. Brauer.
 "Push Me On" produced by Doves and John Leckie; mixed by John Leckie and Dan Austin.
 "Push Me On" (Playgroup Megamix) reproduced and mixed by Trevor Jackson for The Playgroup 2009.
 "Kingdom of Rust" (Still Going Remix) remixed by Eric Duncan and Olivier Spencer for DFA Records.
 "Kingdom of Rust" (Prins Thomas Diskomiks) remixed by Thomas Moen Hermansen.
 "Push Me On" (The Glimmers Mix) remixed by Mo Becha and David "Benoelie" Fouquaert.
 Sleeve design by Rick Myers; shot on location at Northlandz, Flemington, New Jersey.

Charts

References

2009 singles
2009 songs
Doves (band) songs
Heavenly Recordings singles
Songs written by Jez Williams
Songs written by Jimi Goodwin
Songs written by Andy Williams (Doves)